The Lolo-Burmese languages (also Burmic languages) of Burma and Southern China form a coherent branch of the Sino-Tibetan family.

Names
Until ca. 1950, the endonym Lolo was written with derogatory characters in Chinese, and for this reason has sometimes been avoided. Shafer (1966–1974) used the term "Burmic" for the Lolo-Burmese languages. The Chinese term is Mian–Yi, after the Chinese name for Burmese and one of several words for Tai, reassigned to replace Lolo by the Chinese government after 1950.

Possible languages
The position of Naxi (Moso) within the family is unclear, and it is often left as a third branch besides Loloish and Burmish. Lama (2012) considers it to be a branch of Loloish, while Guillaume Jacques has suggested that it is a Qiangic language.

The Pyu language that preceded Burmese in Burma is sometimes linked to the Lolo-Burmese family, but there is no good evidence for any particular classification, and it is best left unclassified within Sino-Tibetan.

Löffler (1966) and Bradley (1997) consider the Mru language to be closely related to or part of Lolo-Burmese, while Matisoff includes Mruic in the Northeast Indian areal group.

Pai-lang, attested from the 3rd century, is Lolo-Burmese, perhaps Loloish.

External relationships
Guillaume Jacques & Alexis Michaud (2011) argue for a Burmo-Qiangic branch with two primary subbranches, Na-Qiangic (i.e. Naxi-Qiangic) and Lolo-Burmese. Similarly, David Bradley (2008) also proposes an Eastern Tibeto-Burman branch that includes the two subbranches of Burmic ( Lolo-Burmese) and Qiangic.

Internal classification
Bradley (1997, quoted in Peiros 1997) gives the following classification for the Lolo-Burmese languages. In later publications, in place of Loloish, David Bradley instead uses the term Ngwi based on a conservative autonym in the Sanie language.

Lolo-Burmese
Mru
Core Lolo-Burmese
Ugong–Burmish
Ugong
Burmish
Loloish (Ngwi)

Lama (2012), in a study of 36 languages, finds the Mondzish cluster (Mondzi–Maang, Mantsi–Mo'ang) to be divergent. He did not include Mru or Ugong.

Lolo-Burmese (Niso-Burmic)
Mondzish
Core Lolo-Burmese
Burmish (Burmic)
Loloish (Nisoic, Ngwi)

Lama (2012) recognizes 9 unambiguous coherent groups of Lolo-Burmese languages, whereas Bradley considers there to be 5 groups (Burmish, Southern Ngwi, Northern Ngwi, Southeastern Ngwi, and Central Ngwi).

Mondzish
Burmish
Hanoish
Lahoish
Naxish
Nusoish
Kazhuoish
Lisoish
Nisoish

See also
Proto-Loloish language

References

Bibliography

Huang, Bufan [黄布凡], ed. (1992). A Tibeto-Burman Lexicon (TBL) [藏缅语族语言词汇]. Beijing: Minzu University Press [中央民族学院出版社].

Satterthwaite-Phillips, Damian. 2011. Phylogenetic inference of the Tibeto-Burman languages or On the usefulness of lexicostatistics (and "Megalo"-comparison) for the subgrouping of Tibeto-Burman. Ph.D. dissertation, Stanford University.

Yunnan Province Geography Gazetteer Committee [云南省地方志编纂委员会] (1998). Yunnan Province Gazetteer, volume 59: ethnic minority languages and orthographies gazetteer [云南省志卷59: 少数民族语言文字志]. Kunming: Yunnan People's Press [云南人民出版社].
Zangmian yuyin he cihui (ZMYYC) [藏缅语语音和词汇] (1991). Beijing: Social Sciences Press [中国社会科学出版社].

 
Languages of India
Languages of Myanmar